Miscellaneous right (DVD) in France refers to right-wing candidates who are not members of any large party.  This can include members of small right-wing parties, dissidents expelled from their party for running against their party's candidate, or candidates who were never formal members of a party.  Numerous  candidates are elected at a local level, but also at a national level.

See also
Independent Conservative
Independent Republican (United States)
Miscellaneous centre
Miscellaneous left

References

Right-wing parties in France
Political parties of the French Fifth Republic
Independent politicians in France